Rock Creek Station and Stricker Homesite is a historical site operated by the Idaho State Historical Society.  It includes the Stricker Store and Farm, which was listed on the National Register of Historic Places in 1979. Two previously important roadways (Oregon Trail and the Kelton Road) met at this site.

History
At one time, the Rock Creek Station was the largest stage station between Fort Hall and Fort Boise. In 1864, Ben Holladay selected the site for a home station on his Overland Stage Line. In 1865, James Bascom built the Rock Creek Store. In 1876, Herman Stricker purchased the store and remained the proprietor until it closed in 1897.

Visitors can see the Rock Creek Store building, Stricker home, reconstructed summer house, and an interpretive center.

References

External links
Rock Creek Station and Stricker Homesite Idaho State Historical Society

Houses on the National Register of Historic Places in Idaho
Houses completed in 1865
Houses in Twin Falls County, Idaho
Museums in Twin Falls County, Idaho
History museums in Idaho
Idaho State Historical Society
National Register of Historic Places in Twin Falls County, Idaho
Stagecoach stations in Idaho